Isuru Udyoga Dodangoda is a Sri Lankan politician, former provincial councillor and Member of Parliament.

Dodangoda is the son of Amarasiri Dodangoda, former government minister and Chief Minister of the Southern Province. He was educated at Ananda College. He has an IT degree from the University of Greenwich and MBA degree from Cardiff Metropolitan University.

Dodangoda was a member of the Southern Provincial Council. He contested the 2020 parliamentary election as a Sri Lanka People's Freedom Alliance electoral alliance candidate in Galle District and was elected to the Parliament of Sri Lanka.

References

Alumni of Ananda College
Alumni of Cardiff Metropolitan University
Alumni of the University of Greenwich
Living people
Members of the 16th Parliament of Sri Lanka
Members of the Southern Provincial Council
Sinhalese politicians
Sri Lanka People's Freedom Alliance politicians
Sri Lanka Podujana Peramuna politicians
United People's Freedom Alliance politicians
Year of birth missing (living people)